Heparanase-2 is an enzyme that in humans is encoded by the HPSE2 gene.

It may be associated with urofacial syndrome.

References

Further reading